Miguel González (born October 1, 1990) is a Mexican footballer who currently plays as a forward.

Career

College & Youth
González began playing college soccer at Peninsula College in 2010, before moving to Seattle University in 2012. He was named WAC Offensive Player of the Year and First Team All-WAC in 2013.

While at college in Seattle, González appeared once for USL PDL club Seattle Sounders U-23 in 2013.

After college, González trialled with Seattle Sounders FC, before signing with PDL side Kitsap Pumas.

Professional

Colorado Springs Switchbacks FC

González signed with USL club Colorado Springs Switchbacks on January 27, 2015.

González ended his first season with the Switchbacks with 10 goals and 7 assists.

On December 9, 2015, it was announced that González will rejoin the Switchbacks for the 2016 United Soccer League season. On March 12, 2016, González scored 1 and assisted 1 in a 3-2 preseason victory against UCCS. Gonzalez scored in the Switchbacks opening game victory of the 2016 USL season, against OKC Energy. His performance earned him a spot on the first 2016 USL Team of the Week.

Oklahoma City Energy FC

On December 6, 2016, González signed with Oklahoma City Energy FC, also of the USL. His brother, Daniel, had played for the Energy the season before and had re-signed with the club a few weeks before. He scored his first goal on April 11, scoring a very impressive bicycle kick.

Miami FC
González joined Miami FC of the National Premier Soccer League on February 4, 2019.

Personal life
González's brother, Daniel, also played for Oklahoma City Energy.

Career statistics

References

External links

Miguel González at USL Championship

1990 births
Living people
Mexican expatriate footballers
Seattle Redhawks men's soccer players
Seattle Sounders FC U-23 players
Kitsap Pumas players
Colorado Springs Switchbacks FC players
Association football forwards
Expatriate soccer players in the United States
Footballers from Michoacán
Mexican footballers
USL League Two players
USL Championship players
National Independent Soccer Association players
Miami FC players
Mexican expatriates in the United States